Butula Constituency is an electoral constituency in Kenya. It is one of seven constituencies in Busia County. The constituency was established for the 1997 elections. The constituency has six wards, all electing members of county assembly(MCA) for the Busia County government. The current member of parliament is Joseph Maero Oyula.

Members of Parliament

Wards

References 

https://www.iebc.or.ke/iebcreports/index.php/2017-register/

Constituencies in Busia County
Constituencies of Western Province (Kenya)
1997 establishments in Kenya
Constituencies established in 1997